Uranium hydride, also called uranium trihydride (UH3), is an inorganic compound and a hydride of uranium.

Properties
Uranium hydride is a highly toxic, brownish grey to brownish black pyrophoric powder or brittle solid. Its density at 20 °C is 10.95 g cm−3, much lower than that of uranium (19.1 g cm−3). It has a metallic conductivity, is slightly soluble in hydrochloric acid and decomposes in nitric acid.

Two crystal modifications of uranium hydride exist, both cubic: an α form that is obtained at low temperatures and a β form that is grown when the formation temperature is above 250 °C. After growth, both forms are metastable at room temperature and below, but the α form slowly converts to the β form upon heating to 100 °C. Both α- and β-UH3 are ferromagnetic at temperatures below ~180 K. Above 180 K, they are paramagnetic.

Formation in uranium metal

Hydrogen gas reaction

Exposure of uranium metal to hydrogen leads to hydrogen embrittlement. Hydrogen diffuses through metal and forms a network of brittle hydride over the grain boundaries. Hydrogen can be removed and ductility renewed by annealing in vacuum.

Uranium metal heated to 250 to 300 °C (482 to 572 °F) reacts with hydrogen to form uranium hydride. Further heating to about 500 °C will reversibly remove the hydrogen. This property makes uranium hydrides convenient starting materials to create reactive uranium powder along with various uranium carbide, nitride, and halide compounds. The reversible reaction proceeds as follows:
2 U + 3 H2  2 UH3

Uranium hydride is not an interstitial compound, causing the metal to expand upon hydride formation. In its lattice, each uranium atom is surrounded by 6 other uranium atoms and 12 atoms of hydrogen; each hydrogen atom occupies a large tetrahedral hole in the lattice. The density of hydrogen in uranium hydride is approximately the same as in liquid water or in liquid hydrogen. The U-H-U linkage through a hydrogen atom is present in the structure.

Water reaction

Uranium hydride forms when uranium metal (e.g. in Magnox fuel with corroded cladding) becomes exposed to water or steam, with uranium dioxide as byproduct:
7 U + 6 H2O → 3 UO2 + 4 UH3
The resulting uranium hydride is pyrophoric;  if the metal (e.g. a damaged fuel rod) is exposed to air afterwards, excessive heat may be generated and the bulk uranium metal itself can ignite. Hydride-contaminated uranium can be passivated by exposure to a gaseous mixture of 98% helium with 2% oxygen. Condensed moisture on uranium metal promotes formation of hydrogen and uranium hydride; a pyrophoric surface may be formed in absence of oxygen. This poses a problem with underwater storage of spent nuclear fuel in spent fuel ponds. Depending on the size and distribution on the hydride particles, self-ignition can occur after an indeterminate length of exposure to air. Such exposure poses risk of self-ignition of fuel debris in radioactive waste storage vaults.

Uranium hydride exposed to water evolves hydrogen. In contact with strong oxidizers this may cause fire and explosions. Contact with halocarbons may cause a violent reaction.

Other chemical reactions

Polystyrene-impregnated uranium hydride powder is non-pyrophoric and can be pressed, however its hydrogen-carbon ratio is unfavorable. Hydrogenated polystyrene was introduced in 1944 instead.

Uranium deuteride is said to be usable for design of some types of neutron initiators.

Uranium hydride enriched to about 5% uranium-235 is proposed as a combined nuclear fuel/neutron moderator for the Hydrogen Moderated Self-regulating Nuclear Power Module. According to the aforementioned patent application, the reactor design in question begins producing power when hydrogen gas at a sufficient temperature and pressure is admitted to the core (made up of granulated uranium metal) and reacts with the uranium metal to form uranium hydride. Uranium hydride is both a nuclear fuel and a neutron moderator; apparently it, like other neutron moderators, will slow neutrons sufficiently to allow for fission reactions to take place; the uranium-235 atoms within the hydride also serve as the nuclear fuel. The loss of neutron moderation due to the chemical decomposition of the uranium hydride will consequently slow — and eventually halt — the reaction. When temperature returns to an acceptable level, the hydrogen will again combine with the uranium metal, forming uranium hydride, restoring moderation and the nuclear reaction will start again.

Uranium zirconium hydride (UZrH), a combination of uranium hydride and zirconium(II) hydride, is used as a fuel/moderator in the TRIGA-class reactors.

On heating with diborane, uranium hydride produces uranium boride. With bromine at 300 °C, uranium(IV) bromide is produced. With chlorine at 250 °C, uranium(IV) chloride is produced. Hydrogen fluoride at 20 °C produces uranium(IV) fluoride. Hydrogen chloride at 300 °C produces uranium(III) chloride. Hydrogen bromide at 300 °C produces uranium(III) bromide. Hydrogen iodide at 300 °C produces uranium(III) iodide. Ammonia at 250 °C produces uranium(III) nitride. Hydrogen sulfide at 400 °C produces uranium(IV) sulfide. Oxygen at 20 °C produces triuranium octoxide. Water at 350 °C produces uranium dioxide.

Uranium hydride ion may interfere with some mass spectrometry measurements, appearing as a peak at mass 239, creating false increase of signal for plutonium-239.

History
Uranium hydride slugs were used in the "tickling the dragon's tail" series of experiments to determine the critical mass of uranium.

Uranium hydride and uranium deuteride were suggested as a fissile material for a uranium hydride bomb. The tests with uranium hydride and uranium deuteride during Operation Upshot–Knothole were disappointing, however. During the early phases of the Manhattan Project, in 1943, uranium hydride was investigated as a promising bomb material; it was abandoned by early 1944 as it turned out that such a design would be inefficient.

Applications
Hydrogen, deuterium, and tritium can be purified by reacting with uranium, then thermally decomposing the resulting hydride/deuteride/tritide. Extremely pure hydrogen has been prepared from beds of uranium hydride for decades. Heating uranium hydride is a convenient way to introduce hydrogen into a vacuum system.

The swelling and pulverization at uranium hydride synthesis can be used for preparation of very fine uranium metal, if the powdered hydride is thermally decomposed.

Uranium hydride can be used for isotope separation of hydrogen, preparing uranium metal powder, and as a reducing agent.

References

Metal hydrides
Nuclear materials
Nuclear fuels
Neutron moderators
Reducing agents
Uranium(III) compounds
Ferromagnetic materials